The 1994 Texas Longhorns football team represented the University of Texas at Austin during the 1994 NCAA Division I-A football season. They were represented in the Southwest Conference. They played their home games at Texas Memorial Stadium in Austin, Texas. The team was led by head coach John Mackovic.

The Longhorns did not close the season with its traditional rivalry game vs. Texas A&M, due to NCAA probation which banned the Aggies from appearing on television. Texas instead closed the season with Baylor in a nationally televised game on Thanksgiving, having played A&M three weeks prior.

Notably, the Longhorns lost to Rice, who they had beaten 28 straight times since the Owls last won on October 23, 1965. It is the last time that the Longhorns have lost to Rice as of 2021. At any rate, this meant that Texas would share a conference title with three other teams that had also lost three conference games; it was their first conference title since 1990 and it would be the first of three straight conference titles under Mackovic as coach.

Schedule

Personnel

Not listed (missing number/class/position): Curtis Jackson

Game summaries

Oklahoma

Stonie Clark tackled James Allen on the one-yard line on fourth down with less than 45 seconds remaining in the game.

References

Texas
Texas Longhorns football seasons
Sun Bowl champion seasons
Texas Longhorns football